Stare Jabłonki  is a village in the administrative district of Gmina Ostróda, within Ostróda County, Warmian-Masurian Voivodeship, in northern Poland.

The village has a population of 700.

Stare Jabłonki is internationally known as the venue for international beach volleyball tournaments. So the place is the regular venue of a beach volleyball tournament of the FIVB Beach Volleyball World Tour. Since 2004, the beach volleyball players play in the small village. In 2013 the FIVB Beach Volleyball World Championships took place here, in 2019 the European Beach Handball Championships. There is also the football club Szeląg Stare Jabłonki.

References

Villages in Ostróda County